Sarames the Elder was an Iranian officer of Median origin, who served in high offices under the Sasanian king Hormizd IV (r. 579–590), possibly as the governor of a province. When Bahram Chobin rebelled against Hormizd IV, Sarames was sent to suppress his rebellion, but was defeated and captured by the latter, who had him trampled to death by elephants.

Sources 

6th-century births
6th-century Iranian people
Generals of Hormizd IV
590 deaths
Military personnel killed in action
Median people